The Cornwall Women's cricket team is the women's representative cricket team for the English historic county of Cornwall. They play their home games at various grounds across the county, and are captained by Kellie Williams. In 2019, they played in Division 3 of the final season of the Women's County Championship, and they have since competed in the Women's Twenty20 Cup. They are partnered with the regional side Western Storm.

History

Cornwall Women began playing in national competition in 2005, when they joined the County Challenge Cup, the second tier of the Women's County Championship: they finished bottom of their division with one win, against Devon. After the County Championship expanded in 2008, they immediately won promotion to Division 4, where they remained for two seasons before being relegated in 2010. Since then, they have remained in the lowest tier of the County Championship, but did top their division in 2013, 2014 and 2018 before losing play-offs to gain promotion.

In the Women's Twenty20 Cup, Cornwall Women have consistently played in Division 3 of the tournament in recent years, after a successful season in 2014, winning all of their matches to be promoted from Division 4. In 2021, Cornwall competed in the South West Group of the Twenty20 Cup and finished 3rd with 4 wins. They finished second in Group 8 of the Twenty20 Cup in 2022, before losing in the group final to Devon.

Players

Current squad
Based on appearances in the 2022 season.

Notable players
Players who have played for Cornwall and played internationally are listed below, in order of first international appearance (given in brackets):

 Laura Harper (1999)

Seasons

Women's County Championship

Women's Twenty20 Cup

See also
 Cornwall County Cricket Club
 Western Storm

References

Women
Women's cricket teams in England